Kyle Rubisch (born August 29, 1988) is a professional lacrosse player for the Saskatchewan Rush in the National Lacrosse League.

College and Club career
Rubisch is a graduate from Dowling College. During his tenure there, he was named to the 2010 Eastern College Athletic Conference (ECAC) All-Star Team and was a First Team All American. He has also received several accolades with his hometown team, the Brampton Excelsiors of Major Series Lacrosse.

Professional career
Rubisch was the 2nd overall draft pick, going to the Boston Blazers in the 2010 NLL Entry Draft. In his rookie season Rubisch headed the Blazers defense recording a team-high 143 loose balls and 20 forced turnovers. Rubisch also netted his first NLL goal against Rochester on April 2. No surprise that after the season, Rubisch was named to NLL All-Rookie Team.

In August 2011, the Blazers announced that they would be suspending operations, and a dispersal draft was held. Rubisch was picked second overall by the Edmonton Rush. Rubisch was named the NLL Defensive Player of the year in 2012, 2013, and 2014.

Heading into the 2023 NLL season, Inside Lacrosse named Rubisch the #6 best defender in the NLL.

International career
Rubisch also represented Canada on the 2011 FIL World Indoor Lacrosse Championship in Prague. He helped his team to win gold medals and he was also named to tournament All-Star Team.

Statistics

NLL
Reference:

References

External links
Stats at NLL.com

Awards

1988 births
Living people
Boston Blazers players
Canadian lacrosse players
Edmonton Rush players
Lacrosse people from Ontario
National Lacrosse League major award winners
National Lacrosse League players
Saskatchewan Rush players
Sportspeople from Brampton